The 2006 Minnesota's 5th congressional district election was an election for the United States House of Representatives for the open seat of incumbent Martin Olav Sabo (DFL), who retired after serving the Minneapolis-based district for 28 years.

Sabo, who had rarely faced a serious electoral challenge, won reelection with 70% of the vote in 2004 in a district that went for John Kerry by 71% in the presidential election. The seat had elected candidates of the Minnesota Democratic-Farmer-Labor Party (DFL) since 1962 and was rated "Safe Democratic" by CQ Politics.

Sabo's surprising announcement in March 2006 prompted many area Democrats to enter the race. While state representative Keith Ellison received the party's endorsement, he was not backed by Sabo and faced stiff primary competition from former Sabo aide Mike Erlandson, among others. Having won the primary, Ellison handily defeated Republican nominee, business consultant Alan Fine, and the Independence nominee, businesswoman Tammy Lee, in the general election.

Democratic-Farmer-Labor primary

Candidates

Received nomination
Keith Ellison, state representative

Defeated in primary
Mike Erlandson, former Chairman of the Minnesota Democratic-Farmer-Labor Party; former Chief of Staff to Martin Olav Sabo
Andrew Vincent Favorite, businessman and former U.S. Navy reservist
Gregg A. Iverson, perennial candidate and U.S. Army veteran
Ember Reichgott Junge, former state senator
Paul Ostrow, member of the Minneapolis City Council
Patrick J. Wiles, former member of the United Auto Workers Local 879 executive board

Withdrew before primary
Gail Dorfman, member of the Hennepin County Commission (endorsed Ellison)
Anne Knapp, former Assistant Commissioner for the Department of Employment Security (endorsed Saavedra)
Jack Nelson-Pallmeyer, Associate Professor of Justice and Peace Studies at the University of St. Thomas (endorsed Ellison)
Jon Olson, President of the Minneapolis Parks Board
Jorge Saavedra, attorney (endorsed Ellison)
Gary Schiff, member of the Minneapolis City Council
Erik Thompson, activist (Ran in the 7th congressional district)

Declined to run
Mark Andrew, former chairman of the Minnesota Democratic-Farmer-Labor Party
Sharon Sayles Belton, former Mayor of Minneapolis
Scott Benson, member of the Minneapolis City Council
Satveer Chaudhary, state senator
Scott Dibble, state senator (endorsed Dorfman)
Betty Folliard, former state representative
Lisa Goodman, member of the Minneapolis City Council
Margaret Anderson Kelliher, state representative (endorsed Ellison)
Peter McLaughlin, member of the Hennepin County Commission
Mike Opat, member of the Hennepin County Commission (endorsed Dorfman, then Erlandson)
R.T. Rybak, Mayor of Minneapolis
Julie Sabo, former state senator

DFL endorsement
Before Sabo announced his retirement, he was already being challenged for the party endorsement by professor and anti-Iraq War activist Jack Nelson-Pallmeyer. Nelson-Pallmeyer's campaign was considered to have little to no chance of succeeding. When Sabo announced his retirement several candidates entered the race, seeking the DFL endorsement to replace him. Hennepin County commissioner Gail Dorfman announced her campaign for the seat on March 21, 2006, becoming the first woman to enter the campaign, and assumed the status of one of the frontrunners due to her strong fundraising record.

At the district convention in May, state representative Keith Ellison won the DFL endorsement after four ballots. Ellison winning the endorsement was considered a surprise, as election analysts had predicted a close race between him, Dorfman and former DFL chair Mike Erlandson, but instead Ellison came away with a convincing margin of victory, with Dorfman in second and Erlandson in fourth, behind Nelson-Pallmeyer. After being heckled by delegates for refusing to commit to endorsing the winner of the convention, Erlandson left the building and decided to run in the primary anyway. This action angered DFL chair Brian Melendez, who accused Erlandson of disloyalty.

Primary election
In the September primary, the retiring Sabo backed Erlandson. Ellison and Erlandson were joined by state senator Ember Reichgott Junge and Minneapolis City Councillor Paul Ostrow in the primary race, along with several minor candidates. 

Junge was widely considered the most moderate candidate, and her campaign was largely focused around healthcare, while Ellison was focused on turning out traditionally overlooked voters, like Somali Americans and members of the LGBT community. However, Ellison's campaign suffered from numerous controversies, such as revelations that he had failed to pay back parking tickets, and that in the early 90s he had written articles praising the Nation of Islam. Erlandson attacked both Ellison and Junge, drawing attention to the controversies Ellison had been involved in, and criticising Junge for numerous votes she had made while a state senator and for being the Minnesota chair of Joe Lieberman's 2004 presidential campaign. Erlandson also emphasised his supposed ability to work with other elected Democrats in order to pass legislation. Ellison went on to win the September 12 primary with 41% of the vote.

Debates

Endorsements

Results

Republican primary
Despite the heavy Democratic lean of the 5th district, Republicans were hopeful that with Sabo's retirement, their candidate would perform well. Before Sabo announced his retirement, two Republicans had already announced campaigns, Tim Anderson and James Turnham. However, by May the 3rd, both had dropped out, with Turnham citing "some unfortunate circumstances" as his reason for doing so, paving the way for business consultant Alan Fine to receive the party's nomination. Viewed as a moderate Republican, Fine was pro-choice, and his campaign was noted in its early days for its gentleness, with Fine himself often playing the piano at campaign events.

Candidates
Alan Fine, business consultant and senior lecturer at the Carlson School of Management

Withdrawn
Tim Anderson
James Turnham

Results

Independence Primary

General election

Candidates
Keith Ellison (Democratic-Farmer-Labor), state representative
Alan Fine (Republican), business consultant and senior lecturer at the Carlson School of Management
Tammy Lee (Independence), businesswoman; former press secretary for U.S. Senator Byron Dorgan
Jay Pond (Green), political scientist; Green nominee for CA-08 in 2002 and MN-05 in 2004
Julian Santana (Socialist Workers), meat packer (write-in)
Larry Leininger (White Working Man's), janitor and candidate for Mayor of Minneapolis in 2001 (write-in)

Campaign
Following Ellison's victory in the DFL primary, Fine and Lee immediately started campaigning. Ellison promised to run a campaign on the "issues", and accused his opponents of attempting to steer the conversation towards his controversies because "on the issues they're in... big trouble". Ellison also attempted to de-emphasise his religion while campaigning. Fine's campaign largely focused on Ellison's past ties to the Nation of Islam and Louis Farrakhan, while Lee's campaign emphasised her fiscal centrism, declaring that Fine was too conservative to beat Ellison. In contrast to Fine and Lee, Pond declared that Ellison was insufficiently liberal, stating that he had not been fast enough to denounce the Iraq War. However, Pond largely failed to gain traction, which was attributed to Ellison's staunch progressivism drawing off left-wing support that Pond might otherwise have received.

In contrast to the genial tone his campaign had taken during the primaries, Fine's general election campaign took a staunchly combative turn. Special attention was drawn to Fine's comments after Ellison had won the primary, when he stated "I’m extremely concerned about Keith Ellison, Keith Hakim, Keith X Ellison, Keith Ellison Muhammad", referring to various pseudonyms Ellison had used when he was in college. These remarks were seen by some as racist, and one of Fine's brothers, Robert Fine, wrote a letter to Ellison denouncing his brother's comments. Fine's campaign was also wracked by allegations that he had abused his former wife in 1995, first revealed in a story by Star Tribune reporter Rochelle Olson. Fine strongly denied the allegations, claiming that Olson had ties to Ellison, and accused the Star Tribune of trying to "rig the election".

Lee capitalized on Ellison's controversies by securing endorsements from a coalition of Minnesota Democrats, including Kathleen Anderson, Sabo's long-time district director. Anderson labelled Ellison a "scofflaw" and stated that Lee was the only candidate "honorable" enough to carry on Sabo's legacy. Lee's campaign was largely focused around winning voters in the more moderate, suburban area of South Minneapolis. As the campaign continued, Lee was widely considered to be in second place, and several Republican officials attempted to convince Fine to drop out of the race in order to prevent the anti-Ellison vote from being split, but he refused.

Media coverage of the race outside of Minnesota largely focused around Ellison's status as the possible first Muslim member of the United States Congress. This focus was criticised both by Ellison's campaign and by Columbia Journalism Review, which found that the media was shoehorning Ellison's religion into articles where it was not relevant, and that the media was not giving anything other than a surface-level depiction of Islam, noting that only the St. Petersburg Times had stated whether Ellison was a Shia or Sunni in their coverage. In contrast, Columbia Journalism Review praised the Star Tribunes coverage of the race, finding that it was more substantial than the coverage in newspapers based outside of Minnesota. Fine strongly criticised the media's coverage of the race, stating that they had not covered Ellison's controversies enough and that they were not discussing the political positions of the candidates.

Sabo's support
During the primary run, departing Representative Sabo had endorsed and donated money to the campaign of his longtime chief of staff, Mike Erlandson. When Ellison won the primary and his campaign manager contacted him, Sabo said that he "wouldn't be supporting anyone in the race". Sabo donated funds to the general election campaigns of many Minnesota Democrats, including Coleen Rowley, Patty Wetterling, Tim Walz, and Amy Klobuchar, but none to Ellison. Several Democrats were disappointed with Sabo's refusal to endorse Ellison. Sabo allowed a picture of himself with Lee to be used in her campaign literature, and in response to this an anonymous individual set up a site designed to look like Lee's campaign website, wherein they accused Sabo of being motivated by racism in his refusal to endorse Ellison. This website was later revealed to have been created by activist Chris Stewart, who in 2006 was elected to the Minneapolis Board of Education.

Debates

There were several debates held over the course of the race, along with numerous forums. 

On October 17 two debates were held on the same night, one hosted by Air America and one hosted by the Beth El synagogue. All four major candidates on the ballot were invited to the Air America debate, though Fine did not attend. Pond was not invited to the Beth El debate, though he did attend it as a member of the audience, and upon seeing him Ellison and Lee escorted him onto the stage in order for him to participate. However, the debate officials refused to allow him to do so, and Pond returned to his seat. In an analysis of the Beth El debate, journalist and blogger David Zingler stated that Fine was the "least impressive" debater, finding that he was answering questions with "rambling dissertations that border on incoherent". 

Shortly prior to the fourth debate, which was held by several student groups at the University of Minnesota, Julian Santana, who was running a write-in campaign for the seat as the nominee of the Socialist Workers Party, unexpectedly showed up, and was allowed to participate. Lee was widely regarded as the winner of the debate, though Pond was also regarded as having a strong performance.

Endorsements

Results

Reactions
Ellison's victory made him the first Muslim member of congress, as well as the first African-American congressman from Minnesota. Ellison's win was positively received by Muslim communities in the United States, who viewed it as an affirmation of their ability to advance politically. Incumbent congressman Sabo congratulated Ellison on his victory, stating "He has a big task in front of him and I wish him well". Sabo also cautioned Ellison against letting his high-profile status become a liability. After his victory, Ellison was denounced by users on the salafist message board Al-Hesbah, who deemed him "the first Jewish Muslim that goes to Congress" and "[a] one-way ticket to hell". Ellison announced that he would use a Quran when being sworn into his seat, a decision which led to the Quran oath controversy of the 110th United States Congress.

References

Further reading

External links
Keith Ellison for Congress
Alan Fine for Congress
Ellison's Minnesota Public Radio profile
Pond's Minnesota Public Radio profile
League of Women Voters Debate
CD 5 Candidate Forum, October 17 (Minnesota Public Radio)
 CD 5 Candidate Forum, October 10 (Minnesota Public Radio)
 CD 5 Candidate Forum, September 21 (Minnesota Public Radio)

2006 5
Minnesota 5
2006 Minnesota elections